Reason is the twelfth extended play by the South Korean boy group Monsta X. It was released by Starship Entertainment and distributed by Kakao Entertainment on January 9, 2023.

Background and release 
In December 2022, Monsta X announced their comeback by releasing the coming soon image of their twelfth EP Reason through their official SNS, in an intense black image, with the release date announced on January 9, 2023. It is their first comeback after contract renewal.

Joohoney participated in writing, composing, and arranging the tracks "Crescendo" and "It's Okay", while Hyungwon and I.M for tracks "Lone Ranger" and "Deny", respectively, as well as in writing the Korean lyrics for the title track "Beautiful Liar".

The physical EP was released in four standard versions, with the addition of the jewel cases version, KiT version, and a cassette tape version.

Composition 
Reason depicts the story of their "reason" for building a presence through perfect teamwork. It contains the process of finding a clear reason for existence in various relationships and discovering the meaning of each other. It is also means of finding the "reason" for their existence, which melted the ontological reflection of group members, that with efforts to face fear and compassion during fierce times, they were able to discover the reasons behind all their emotions and find value in their relationship with fans. This conveys the message that one does not need to find reason in relationships with underlying trust. 

"Beautiful Liar" is a rhythmical and powerful punk rock-style song that sings the reason for love found in the most extreme and dangerous relationship. It has highly addictive beat and high-quality vocals and performance, providing a more intense sense of immersion. "Daydream" is a song that showed the group's soft and alluring side, while "Crescendo" creates a strange charm with the sound of a mixture of the Korean traditional musical instrument geomungo and taepyeongso. "Lone Ranger", a track that has an impressive unique Western sound, "Deny" is an irresistible R&B track, and "It's Okay" is a song which describes the heart of a coward who is still haunted by a breakup, but acts like everything is alright.

Promotion 
Starting in December 2022, the group sequentially released their track list, image teasers, concept films, and four versions of concept photos. Afterwards, the music video teasers for the title song on January 5 and 6, 2023. The album preview opened on January 8, with the release of the album and full-fledged comeback activity began on January 9. Monsta X showed contents related to their twelfth EP Reason, through Melon's online and offline new lighting service Melon Spotlight and original audio content service Melon Station. Their comeback showcase was held to commemorate the release of their album, as well as to showcase the stage of its b-side songs, through Naver Now on January 10, as well as the global K-pop rhythm game SuperStar Starship's commemorative mini-album Reason new song update release, which contains a special design with a deadly concept. Starting on January 12, they opened an exhibition and pop-up store to commemorate the release of their album, which consists of an exhibition that conveys the meaning and complex emotions contained in the album, and a store where one can purchase albums and official goods, each section tailored to the four concepts of Monsta X's new album, along with special event benefits such as lucky draws.

Critical reception 

It was one of "The Most Anticipated Albums of 2023" by the entertainment and popular culture news website Uproxx. Certain prominent foreign media outlets from the United States and United Kingdom also praised and gave it favorable reviews. 

Abbie Aitken of Clash described it as "an accumulation of Monsta X's past eight years", with six contrasting and neatly polished tracks, each showcasing "a different genre highlighting the group's versatility". They had "never felt limited to a singular genre", instead they "evolved their presence in the worlds of R&B, pop and rock".

Listicles

Commercial performance 
Reason topped the Circle Chart's Retail Album Chart, for the week of January 8 to 14, with 156,265 copies sold, as well as the Circle Album Chart, with 389,972 copies sold. It also topped the Hanteo Chart's Weekly Physical Record Chart, which recorded 372,257.28 index points (album sales of 326,503 copies), as well as its Weekly World Chart, then its Weekly Global Authentication Chart on the following week.

In addition to its record, it entered the Melon's "Hall of Fame", which displays honorable records of domestic and foreign artists, with domestically released albums, joining the "Million Album", an album category which celebrates albums that have achieved more than one million streams within 24 hours of release, with a record of 3,869,100 total streams, being the highest of all the albums released in 2023, and had been commemorated in the "Million Album of All Time".

It debuted at number 26 on Oricon's Japanese Digital Albums, for the week of January 9 to 15, with 157 downloads, as well as at number 73 on Billboard Japan Hot Albums.

For the other tracks, they all entered the Billboards Hot Trending Songs Chart, for the week of January 6 to 12, with "Deny" at number 1, "Crescendo" at number 5, "Lone Ranger" at number 6, "Daydream" at number 7, and "It's Okay" at number 9. The tracks also entered the Circle Digital Chart, for the week of January 8 to 14, with "Daydream" at number 117, "Lone Ranger" at number 122, "Crescendo" at number 124, "Deny" at number 126, and "It's Okay" at number 131.

Track listing

Charts

Weekly charts

Monthly chart

Certification and sales

Release history

See also 
 List of K-pop songs on the Billboard charts
 List of Circle Album Chart number ones of 2023

Notes

References 

2023 EPs
Korean-language EPs
Monsta X EPs
Starship Entertainment EPs